In the Battle of Jemappes on 6 November 1792, a French army led by Charles François Dumouriez attacked and defeated an Austrian army commanded by Albert of Saxe-Teschen. Though the Austrians were outnumbered three-to-one, the victory greatly encouraged the population of the young First French Republic and lead to the evacuation of Austrian forces from the Austrian Netherlands.  Note: all units have their names as they are translated in English.

Army of the Ardennes
The Army of the Ardennes is led by Divisional General Charles-François du Périer Dumouriez.  Dumouriez gave his army the private name of the 'Army of Belgium' (Armée de la Belgique), however this was never officially recognised or adopted.  Note: all cavalry regiments have 3 x squadrons unless otherwise noted.  All line infantry regiments have 2 x battalions unless other wise noted.

 Army of the Ardennes, commanded by Divisional General Charles-François du Périer Dumouriez
 Reserve, commanded by Maréchal de Camp Louis-Charles de La Motte-Ango, Vicomte de Flers
 2 x Squadrons, Gendarmerie Nationale
 2nd–5th (at least) plus more?  Battalions, Grenadiers of the Ardennes
 Cavalry (2 x Squadrons each)
 1st Brigade 3rd Dragoon Regiment
 7th Dragoon Regiment
 2nd Brigade 5th Dragoon Regiment
 13th Dragoon Regiment

 Advance Guard 

 Advance Guard, commanded by Lieutenant General Pierre de Ruel, Marquis de Beurnonville
 1 x Horse Artillery Battery
 3rd Light Artillery Company
 6th Light Artillery Company
 Dampièrre's Brigade, commanded by Maréchal de Camp Auguste Marie Henri Pictor, Marquis de Dampierre
 1st Hussar Regiment
 2nd Hussar Regiment
 6th Hussar Regiment
 3rd Chasseurs à Cheval Regiment
 6th Chasseurs à Cheval Regiment
 12th Chasseurs à Cheval Regiment
 1 x Battalion, Belgian Legion
 1st Grenadier Battalion of the Ardennes
 6th Grenadier Battalion of the Ardennes
 1 x Battalion, 19th Line Infantry Regiment
 1st Battalion, Paris National Guard
 2nd Battalion, Paris National Guard
 10th Chasseurs à Pied Battalion
 14th Chasseurs à Pied Battalion
 Company of the Four Nations
 1st Free Company
 3rd Free Company
 Chasseur Company of Cambrelots
 Flankers of the Left, commanded by General Miazynski
 1 x Battalion, 99th Line Infantry Regiment
 5th Chasseurs à Pied Battalion
 Flankers of the Right, commanded by Brigade General Henri Christian Michel de Stengel
 3rd Battalion, Ardennes National Guard
 11th Chasseurs à Pied Battalion
 Company of Clemendos

 Right Wing 

 Right Wing, commanded by Maréchal de Camp Jean Henri Becays Ferrand

 First Line 

 First Line, commanded by Maréchal de Camp Jean Henri Becays Ferrand
 1st Brigade 5th Battalion, Seine Inférieure National Guard
 1st Battalion, Charente National Guard
 17th Federals Battalion
 3rd Brigade 1st Battalion, Deux Sèvres National Guard
 1st Battalion, Meurthe National Guard
 1st Battalion, Vendée National Guard
 5th Brigade 29th Line Infantry Regiment
 Gravilliers National Guard Battalion
 1st Battalion, Côtes du Nord National Guard
 7th Brigade 2nd Battalion, 54th Line Infantry Regiment
 Lombards National Guard Battalion
 2nd Battalion, Marne National Guard

 Second Line 

 Second Line, commanded by General de Brigade Pierre Louis de Blottefière
 9th Brigade 83rd Line Infantry Regiment
 Republican National Guard
 11th Brigade 78th Line Infantry Regiment
 4th Battalion, Meuse National Guard
 5th Battalion, Meurthe National Guard
 13th Brigade 1st Battalion, Marne National Guard
 1st Battalion, Mayenne et Loire National Guard
 2nd Battalion, Eure National Guard
 15th Brigade 1st Battalion, 98th Line Infantry Regiment
 1st Battalion, Seine Inférieure National Guard
 1st Battalion, Seine et Oise National Guard

 Left Wing 

 Left Wing, commanded by Lieutenant General Francisco de Miranda y Rodríguez de Espinoza

 First Line 

 First Line, commanded by Brigade General Louis Théobald Ihler
 2nd Brigade, commanded by Brigade General Jean Daniel Pinet de Borde-Desforêts
 1 x Battalion, 1st Line Infantry Regiment
 1st Battalion, Aisne National Guard
 Sainte Marguerite National Guard Battalion
 4th Brigade 1st Battalion, Côte d'Or National Guard
 2nd Battalion, Vienne National Guard
 3rd Battalion, Yonne National Guard
 6th Brigade 1st Battalion, 49th Line Infantry Regiment
 1st Battalion, Eure et Loir National Guard
 9th Federals Battalion
 8th Brigade 1st Battalion, 71st Line Infantry Regiment
 3rd Marne National Guard
 Saint-Denis National Guard Battalion

 Second Line 

 Second Line, commanded by Maréchal de Camp Maximilien Ferdinand Thomas Stettenhofen
 10th Brigade, commanded by Maréchal de Camp Jean Daniel Pinet de Borde-Desforêts
 72nd Line Infantry Regiment
 Butte des Moulins National Guard Battalion
 12th Brigade 94th Line Infantry Regiment
 1st Battalion, Pas de Calais National Guard
 9th Battalion, Paris National Guard
 14th Brigade 1st Battalion, Allier National Guard
 1st Battalion, Nièvre National Guard
 1st Battalion, Seine et Marne National Guard
 16th Brigade 104th Line Infantry Regiment
 Paris Battalion of Grenadiers
 3rd Battalion, Seine et Oise National Guard

Austrian Army of the Netherlands
The Austrian Army of the Netherlands guarded the entirety of the Austrian Netherlands (mostly encompassing modern day Belgium) and was one of the few field armies in service during the time of the battle.  By 7 November, the Army was evacuated to Germany and broken up shortly thereafter.  All infantry regiments have 2 x battalions, and cavalry have 4 x squadrons unless otherwise noted.

 Austrian Army of the Netherlands, commanded by Feldmarschallleutnant Josef Karl, Baron von Lilien
 Cavalry Reserve, commanded by Generalmajor Lamberg
 1/2, Coburg Dragoon Regiment Nr. 37 (4 x squadrons)
 Latour Chevauléger Regiment Nr. 31 (2 x squadrons)
 Esterházy Hussar Regiment Nr. 32 (2 x squadrons)
 Infantry Reserve 1 x Battalion, Hohenlohe Infantry Regiment Nr. 17
 Mattheson Infantry Regiment Nr. 42 (4 x companies)
 5 x Companies, Tirolean Sharpshooters

 Right Wing 
Note: Both free corps totalled 873 men in 7 companies

 Right Wing, commanded by Feldmarschallleutnant Josef Karl, Baron von Lilien
 Grüne-Loudon Free Corps
 O'Donnel's Free Corps
 Archduke Karl's Brigade, commanded by Generalmajor Archduke Karl Laurentius of Austria
 Morzin Grenadier Battalion
 Barthodeiszky of Rátk and Salamonfa Grenadier Battalion
 Keim's Brigade, commanded by Oberst Konrad Valentin Ritter von Keim
 Blankenstein Hussar Regiment Nr. 16 (3 x squadrons)
 Bender Infantry Regiment Nr. 41

 The Centre 

 Centre, commanded by Feldzeugmeister François Sébastien Charles Joseph de Croix, Count of Clerfayt
 Boros' Brigade, commanded by Generalmajor Adam Boros de Rákos
 1/2, Coburg Dragoon Regiment Nr. 37 (4 x squadrons)
 Mikoviny's Brigade, commanded by Generalmajor Stanislaus Mikovényi de Breznobánya
 Leeuven Grenadier Battalion
 Pückler Grenadier Battalion
 Würzburg Infantry Regiment (HRE, not Austrian)

 Left Wing 

 Left Wing, commanded by Feldmarschallleutnant Johann Peter, Count Beaulieu de Marconnay
 1 x Squadron, Blankenstein Hussar Regiment Nr. 16
 Servisches Free Corps (5 x companies)
 Jordis' Brigade''', commanded by Generalmajor Alexander, Freiherr von Jordis
 1 x Battalion, Hohenlohe Infantry Regiment Nr. 17
 Stuart Infantry Regiment Nr. 18

Footnotes

References 

 

French Revolutionary Wars orders of battle